Hatakka is a surname. Notable people with the surname include:

 Anja Hatakka (born 1938), Finnish actress
 Dani Hatakka (born 1994), Finnish footballer
 Kärtsy Hatakka (born 1967), Finnish musician